Beatriz Bezerra (born 1 March 2006) is a Brazilian competitive swimmer. At the 2022 World Junior Championships, she won silver medals in the 50-metre butterfly and 100-metre butterfly and a bronze medal in the 4×100-metre freestyle relay. She is a five-time gold medalist and one-time silver medalist at the 2022 South American Youth Games.

Background
Bezerra was born 1 March 2006 in Brazil.

Career

2022
In April and May, at the 2022 South American Youth Games, held in Rosario, Argentina, Bezerra won gold medals in the 50-metre butterfly, 4×100-metre freestyle relay, 4×100-metre medley relay, 4×100-metre mixed freestyle relay, and 4×100-metre mixed medley relay, as well as a silver medal in the 100-metre butterfly.

2022 World Junior Championships
At the 2022 FINA World Junior Swimming Championships, held starting 30 August in Lima, Peru, Bezerra won her first medal of the Championships on day four with a silver medal in the 50-metre butterfly, finishing second behind Jana Pavalić of Croatia in the final with a personal pest time of 26.67 seconds. She won her second medal the following day, splitting the third-fastest second leg relay time in the final of the 4×100-metre freestyle relay, less than two seconds slower than the fastest second leg swimmer Nikolett Pádár of Hungary, to help win the bronze medal with a final time of 3:50.13. The sixth and final day of competition, she won her third medal, a silver medal in the 100-metre butterfly with a personal best time of 59.69 seconds. Her three medals helped tie the all-time best medal table performance for Brazil at a single FINA World Junior Swimming Championships, a record of five total medals, one gold, three silver, and one bronze, from the first edition of the competition, held in 2006. In her other four events, she placed fifth in the finals of the 4×100-metre mixed medley relay and the 4×100-metre mixed freestyle relay, placed sixth in the final of the 100-metre freestyle with a personal best time of 56.97 seconds, and placed sixth in the final of the 50-metre freestyle with a personal best time of 26.28 seconds.

At the 2022 Carlos Campos Sobrinho Trophy in late November in Recife, Bezerra won the 100-metre butterfly with a new competition record of 1:00.44 after first setting a new competition record of 1:00.81 in the preliminaries.

International championships (50 m)

Personal best times

Long course metres (50 m pool)

Awards and honours
 Brazilian Olympic Committee, Year-end Junior Athletes Retrospective, highlight: 2022
 Olimpíada Todo Dia, Youth Athletes Retrospective, highlight: 2022

References

External links
 

2006 births
Living people
Brazilian female butterfly swimmers
Brazilian female freestyle swimmers
21st-century Brazilian women